Justin Choigee Chang (born January 3, 1983) is an American film critic and columnist for the Los Angeles Times. He previously worked for Variety.

Early life
Justin Chang graduated from the University of Southern California in 2004. Chang first became interested in film critique while in high school because he found it fascinating that "two or three (or 40 or 50) intelligent people could watch a film and come away with completely different reactions to it."

Career
Chang began his career in 2004. He works for the Los Angeles Times, and is a regular contributor to the NPR programs FilmWeek and Fresh Air. Previously, he was hired at Variety magazine in 2004, and became a senior film critic for the magazine in 2010 before being promoted to its chief film critic in 2013. He is the author of the book FilmCraft: Editing. Chang is the chair of the National Society of Film Critics and the secretary of the Los Angeles Film Critics Association. In 2014, he received the inaugural Roger Ebert Award from the African-American Film Critics Association.

While accepting the New Generation Award for Creed at the Los Angeles Film Critics Association Awards ceremony in January 2016, American film director and screenwriter Ryan Coogler praised Chang for his contributions to criticism. Coogler recalled attending the Cannes Film Festival in 2009 as a student filmmaker scrounging tickets and spending his down time in the Variety tent, where a "crazy typing guy" caught his attention:

I would see people coming in and out, working. But it was this guy, going crazy on his laptop, and he would run off, and then he'd come back and go crazy on his laptop, and he would run off. He looked different from everybody else in the room, because he was Asian. So I was thinking, 'What's this Asian dude doing in here, typing away on his laptop, crazy?' He would type like a madman. He would type with a fury that I recognized, because that's how I type — with passion, when I'm trying to get words out. One day I asked, and they said, 'That's Justin. He's our critic.' It was crazy, because I said, 'Oh wow, this is the first time I've actually seen a critic work.' I read reviews, I would see Siskel and Ebert on TV, I met critics' studies majors at my school, but I'd never seen a critic do the work.... I always remembered that.

When I'd come back home, I said you know I'm going to read that crazy typing dude Justin's reviews and I'm gonna see if there's any other good movies at the festival that I've missed, and I read his review for a film called A Prophet. While I was reading it, I realized this dude is crazy talented, like I'd never seen. This is artistry. I had a newfound respect for what it is [film critics] do and its importance to the media. Reach back out into the community and find the next Justin Chang. Find the diversity. Find all those voices that are there in the places that you might not think to look. Because it'd be amazing to see the next generation of [critics], and to have maybe more of them look like [Sue Kroll, president of Warner Bros.], and more of them look like me and [Michael B. Jordan], and more of them look like Justin.

Chang produces an annual "best-of-the-year" movie list, thereby providing an overview of his critical preferences. His top choices were: 
 2013: Before Midnight
 2014: Boyhood
 2015: The Assassin
 2016: Silence
 2017: Call Me By Your Name
 2018: Burning
 2019: Parasite
 2020: Vitalina Varela
 2021: Drive My Car
 2022: No Bears

Personal life
Chang is a Christian.

Bibliography

References

External links

Justin Chang at NPR

1983 births
21st-century American male writers
21st-century American non-fiction writers
American Christians
American film critics
National Society of Film Critics Members
American people of Chinese descent
Christian writers
Living people
Los Angeles Times people
University of Southern California alumni
Writers from Los Angeles